The Martín Pescador MP-1000 was an Argentine air-to-surface missile developed by the CITEFA (Instituto de Investigaciones Científicas y Técnicas de las FFAA - Armed Forces Scientific and Technical Research Institute). The main user was the COAN (Comando Aviación Naval - Naval Aviation Command) of the Argentine Navy.

The first evaluations were carried out in 1975 firing around 60 test missiles in the span of two years. The Argentine Air Force got off the project claiming that it was not there to "sink ships", and the Navy slowed it down, although there are photos that show that at least a dozen were deployed in the 1978 Beagle Conflict, mostly to be used since the Aermacchi of Naval Aviation. However, they were not used in the Falklands War, citing, among other things, the nature of British anti-aircraft defenses. Finally, they were homologated after firing from T-28 Trojan aircraft, and the first related shot was fired by Captain Rodolfo Castro Fox of the COAN.

It is a remote-guided missile, after visually identifying its target, the pilot must radio control the missile during its flight. To assist you in viewing the projectile, it has two colored flares on its rear. The pilot must control the missile visually and compensate for any drift that may be made until it reaches its target. This guidance system is similar to the American AGM-12 Bullpup missile.

Despite the training required to operate the missile and the aircraft at the same time, the guidance system is really simple and can be mounted on a wide variety of aircraft. It has been successfully used in the T-28 Trojans and Aermacchi MB-326s of the Argentine Navy, and in the IA-58 Pucará of the Argentine Air Force. It can also be used from hovering helicopters, for which a philoguided version (directed by cable) was developed.

They were withdrawn in the 1990s, and were donated to CITEFA to contribute to the development of the improved CITEFA AS-25K .

Technical specifications
Type: Anti-ship missile
Manufacturer: CITEFA
Diameter: 22 cm (2 ft 5 in)
Length: 295 cm (86 in)
Wingspan: 73 cm (2 ft 5 in)
Total weight:  140 kg (308 lb)
Standard warhead weight/mass: 40 kg (88 lb)
Warhead type: HE
Maximum range: 
Guidance: radio command

See also 
CITEFA Mathogo anti-tank missile
CITEFA AS-25K air-to-surface missile
List of anti-ship missiles

References
 references and images about this missile, as predecessor to the AS-25K
 Technical Specifications
 Specifications and brief description

External links
 Weaponry of the COAN
 CITEFA web site (also in English)
 Technical details

Air-to-surface missiles of the Cold War
Guided missiles of Argentina
Military equipment introduced in the 1970s